Hever is a village in Flanders, Belgium.

References

Populated places in Flemish Brabant